XHUD-FM is a radio station on 100.1 FM in Tuxtla Gutiérrez, Chiapas. The station is owned by Radio Núcleo and is known as La Ke Buena with a grupera format.

History
XEUD-AM 1360 received its concession on July 10, 1979. It has always been owned by the Siman family.

XEUD was approved to migrate to FM in 2010.

References

Radio stations in Chiapas
Radio stations established in 1979